FC Progresul Briceni was a Moldovan football club based in Briceni, Moldova. They played in the Moldovan National Division, the top division in Moldovan football.

History
1992 – foundation as FC Vilia Briceni

1994 – renaming in FC Progresul Briceni

1996 – dissolution

Achievements
Divizia A
 Winners (1): 1992–93

External links
 Progresul Briceni at WeltFussballArchive 

Football clubs in Moldova
Defunct football clubs in Moldova
Association football clubs established in 1992
Association football clubs disestablished in 1996
1992 establishments in Moldova
1996 disestablishments in Moldova